"Goin' Southbound" is a song by American singer-songwriter Stan Ridgway and is the first single released in support of his 1989 album Mosquitos.

Formats and track listing 
All songs written by Stan Ridgway

European 7" single (060 24 1026 6)
"Goin' Southbound" – 4:43
"Newspapers" – 2:42

Australian 7" single (102088-7)
"Goin' Southbound" – 4:43
"Peg and Pete and Me" – 2:42

Charts

References

External links 
 

1989 songs
1989 singles
I.R.S. Records singles
Stan Ridgway songs
Songs written by Stan Ridgway